Alphacrambus phoeostrigellus is a moth of the family Crambidae in the genus Alphacrambus. It was described by George Hampson in 1903 and is known from India.

References

Moths described in 1903
Crambini
Moths of Asia